Yao Ben (born 29 July 1997) is a Chinese footballer currently playing as a defender for Nantong Zhiyun.

Club career
Yao Ben would play for the Jiangsu Suning youth and reserve teams until the clubs disbandment due to financial difficulties on 28 February 2021. He go on to join neighbouring second tier club Nantong Zhiyun on 11 April 2021. He would go on to make his senior debut in a league game on 9 September 2021 against Zibo Cuju in a 5-0 victory. He would go on to be a squad player within the team and helped the club gain promotion to the top tier at the end of the 2022 China League One season.

Career statistics
.

References

External links

1997 births
Living people
Chinese footballers
Association football defenders
China League One players
Jiangsu F.C. players
Nantong Zhiyun F.C. players